Adam Brian Lockwood (born 26 October 1981) is an English former professional footballer who played as a defender. He is the sporting director of Wakefield A.F.C.

Career
Lockwood began his career as a trainee with Reading, after being released as a youth player by Leeds United. He turned professional in August 1999, but failed to break into the Reading first team and in 2000 joined Maidenhead United to gain first team experience. In February 2001 he joined Forest Green Rovers on loan until the end of the season. He appeared in the 2001 FA Trophy final for Forest Green but was on the losing side in a 1–0 defeat. In September 2001 he joined Yeovil Town on loan, a month later making the move permanent on a free transfer.

He was a member of the side that won the FA Trophy in May 2002, having been a runner up the year before with Forest Green, and helped Yeovil to the Conference and League Two titles. He struggled with injuries in the 2004–05 season, but signed a new one-year contract in August 2005. However, he struggled to re-establish himself and in November 2005, joined West Country rivals Torquay United on loan, returning to Yeovil in January 2006.

He moved to Doncaster Rovers in July 2006. Lockwood committed his future to the club by signing a 2-year extension to his contract at Rovers in the summer of 2010. On 18 May 2012, Doncaster Rovers confirmed that Lockwood would be released at the end of his contract having made 180 appearances scoring 8 goals.

On 4 July 2012, Lockwood signed for League One side Bury following his release from Doncaster. He made his home debut for Bury on 18 August 2012, in a 1–1 draw against Brentford. He scored his first goal for the club on 10 November 2012, in a 2–0 win at home against Portsmouth at Fratton Park.

On 25 September 2013, Lockwood was released by Bury after the two parties mutually agreed to terminate his contract.

The following month he joined Conference North side Guiseley. He made several appearances quickly becoming a favourite to the fans. After fantastic displays for The Lions he caught the attention of Oldham Athletic A.F.C. It was no surprise he had signed for a league club,

Oldham Athletic
Lockwood joined Oldham Athletic on 3 January 2014 until the end of the 2013–14 season. Lockwood made his debut for the club against Wolves on 28 January, coming on for the injured Genseric Kusunga in the 55th minute of the game.

Lockwood scored his first goal for the club in a game against M.K. Dons

Lockwood scored his second goal for the club in the last game of the season, against Notts County in a 1–1 draw, extending Oldham's unbeaten run to 10 games. Lockwood was also sent off in the game, thus meaning he would be suspended at the start of the 2014–15 season.

The one – year option the club had on Lockwood's contract was exercised, extending his contract till the end of the 2014–15 season.

Lockwood won the Spirit of Oldham award at the end of season player awards, this award being given to the player who had had the biggest impact at the club since their arrival at the club mid – season.

Manager Johnson named Lockwood as club captain for the 2014–15 season.

Guiseley
In June 2015 Lockwood joined newly promoted National League side Guiseley A.F.C from Oldham. When Guiseley manager Mark Bower was sacked in 2016 with the club bottom of the National League, Lockwood was appointed manager in September 2016 with Dave Penney as assistant. He helped the club avoid relegation on the final day of the 2016–17 season, but was sacked on 30 August 2017 at a time when Guiseley were third-from-bottom in the table.

Career statistics

Managerial statistics

References

External links
Adam Lockwood profile at the Guiseley A.F.C. website

1981 births
Living people
Footballers from Wakefield
English footballers
Association football defenders
Leeds United F.C. players
Reading F.C. players
Maidenhead United F.C. players
Forest Green Rovers F.C. players
Yeovil Town F.C. players
Torquay United F.C. players
Doncaster Rovers F.C. players
Bury F.C. players
Oldham Athletic A.F.C. players
Guiseley A.F.C. players
English Football League players
National League (English football) players
English football managers
Guiseley A.F.C. managers
National League (English football) managers